The sexual abuse scandal in Bridgeport Diocese is a significant episode in the series of Catholic sex abuse cases in the United States.

Supreme Court of Connecticut decision
In May 2009, a decision by the Connecticut Supreme Court ordered the release of thousands of legal documents from lawsuits filed against priests accused of sexually abusing children (George L. Rosado et al. v. Bridgeport Roman Catholic Diocesan Corporation et al., (SC 17807).)

Archbishop Egan's legacy

In 1993, during Cardinal Egan's time as Bishop of Bridgeport, 23 lawsuits were filed against the diocese, alleging sexual abuse by priests. The 23 claims were settled in 2001, which was one year after Egan left the Diocese of Bridgeport after being appointed Archbishop of New York. Five priests were evicted from the ministry. Two Diocese of Bridgeport priests, Kherian Ahearn and John Castaldo, were convicted on sex abuse charges respectively in 1993 and 2001. However, many who were credibly accused during Egan's time as Bishop died without being prosecuted. In April 2002, in a letter read out at Mass, Cardinal Egan apologized saying, "If in hindsight we also discover that mistakes may have been made as regards prompt removal of priests and assistance to victims, I am deeply sorry." Nearly ten years later, in February 2012, the retired cardinal retracted his apology. In an interview with Connecticut  magazine he said, "I never should have said that," and, "I don't think we did anything wrong." He repeatedly denied that any sexual abuse happened while he was leading the Bridgeport diocese.

US Supreme Court decision
On October 5, 2009, the United States Supreme Court rejected a request by the diocese to stay the Connecticut Supreme Court decision. On Nov. 2, 2009 the United States Supreme Court decided  not to grant a writ of certiorari.

Subsequent Events
Bishop William E. Lori has opposed legislation by State Representative Michael P. Lawlor and State Senator Andrew J. McDonald that would remove control of the diocese from the bishop and place it into the hands of laymen.
The legislation had been written with the help of liberal Catholics, including Connecticut attorney Thomas Gallagher, a contributor to the group Voice of the Faithful.

November 2009 hearings
The Connecticut Superior Court held hearings in November 2009 on procedures and privacy safeguards. The court ordered that the documents be released on Dec. 1, 2009, in CD form, to be given to the four newspapers—the Hartford Courant, the New York Times, Boston Globe and Washington Post—that had originally filed the lawsuit seeking to force the diocese to open the records to public inspection. The diocese has provided background and a statement on the suit and its status.

October 2019 judicial report
In October 2019, former Connecticut Superior Court Judge Robert Holzberg released the results of his investigation, commissioned by Bridgeport Bishop Frank Caggiano, into the Diocese's handling of accusations of sexual abuse by its priests. Holzberg found that all three of Bridgeport's bishops over forty years had consistently failed to fulfill their moral and legal responsibilities. Holzberg found that Egan took a "dismissive, uncaring, and at times threatening attitude toward survivors"; he characterized the bishop's behavior as "profoundly unsympathetic, inadequate, and inflammatory". Holzberg's report, which stemmed from a year-long investigation, accused 71 priests of sexually abusing 300 children since 1953. However, it also praised the reforms which were made by Egan's successors William Lori and Frank Caggiano to combat sex abuse and compared their tenure to that of their predecessors as "a tale of two cities."

Case of Jaime Marin-Cardona
In March 2020, it was announced that the pre-trial hearing for accused Danbury priest Jaime Marin-Cardona would begin March 27, 2020 and conclude April 21, 2020. Marin-Cardona was officially charged with three counts of fourth-degree sexual assault, three counts of risk of injury to child and three counts of illegal sexual contact. He was arrested on January 3, 2020 and released on bond four weeks later after agreeing to wear a tracking device and comply with protective orders. He has pled not guilty to all nine charges.

See also
Charter for the Protection of Children and Young People
National Review Board
Pontifical Commission for the Protection of Minors

References

External links
Audits, Child And Youth Protection; US Conference of Catholic Bishops
Charter For The Protection Of Children And Young People; US Conference of Catholic Bishops
Child And Youth Protection; US Conference of Catholic Bishops
National Review Board,  Child And Youth Protection; US Conference of Catholic Bishops
Safe Environment, Child And Youth Protection; US Conference of Catholic Bishops
Victim Assistance, Child And Youth Protection; US Conference of Catholic Bishops

Child sexual abuse in the United States
Catholic Church sexual abuse scandals in the United States
Crime in Connecticut